The year 1801 in architecture involved some significant events.

Buildings and structures

Buildings

 April 21 – The Teatro Nuovo in Trieste, an opera house designed by Gian Antonio Selva (interior) and Matteo Pertsch (exterior), is inaugurated.
 The New London Harbor Lighthouse in New London, Connecticut is completed.

Awards
 Grand Prix de Rome, architecture: (unknown).

Births
May 11 – Henri Labrouste, French architect of the École des Beaux Arts (died 1875)
June 4 – James Pennethorne, English architect and planner working in London (died 1871)
June 5 – William Scamp, English architect working in Malta (died 1872)
date unknown – John Semple, Irish architect (died 1882)

Deaths
September 6 – William Tyler, sculptor and architect, co-founder of the Royal Academy (born 1728)

References

Architecture
Years in architecture
19th-century architecture